The Sagan standard is a neologism abbreviating the aphorism that "extraordinary claims require extraordinary evidence" (ECREE).  It is named after science communicator Carl Sagan who used the exact phrase on his television program Cosmos.

Similar statements were previously made by figures such as Théodore Flournoy in 1899, Pierre-Simon Laplace in 1814, and Thomas Jefferson in 1808.  The formulation "Extraordinary claims require extraordinary proof" was used just two years prior to Sagan, by sociologist Marcello Truzzi, in 1978.

Application
The Sagan standard, according to Tressoldi (2011), "is at the heart of the scientific method, and a model for critical thinking, rational thought and skepticism everywhere".

ECREE is related to Occam's razor in the sense that according to such a heuristic, simpler explanations are preferred to more complicated ones. Only in situations where extraordinary evidence exists would an extraordinary claim be the simplest explanation. A routinized form of this appears in hypothesis testing where the hypothesis that there is no evidence for the proposed phenomenon, what is known as the "null hypothesis", is preferred. The formal argument involves assigning a stronger Bayesian prior to the acceptance of the null hypothesis as opposed to its rejection. 

There are no concrete parameters as to what constitutes "extraordinary claims", which raises the issue of whether the standard is subjective. According to Tressoldi this problem is less apparent in clinical medicine and psychology where statistical results can establish the strength of evidence.

History
The aphorism was made popular by astronomer Carl Sagan who used it in the 1980 television show Cosmos in reference to claims about aliens visiting Earth. Sagan made similar statements in a 1977 interview in The Washington Post, and his 1979 book Broca's Brain; Marcello Truzzi did likewise in Parapsychology Review in 1975 and Zetetic Scholar in 1978.  Two 1978 articles, one in U.S. News & World Report and another by Koneru Ramakrishna Rao in the Journal of Parapsychology both quote physicist Philip Abelson, then the editor of Science, using the same phrase. 

Others had earlier put forward very similar ideas. Quote Investigator cites similar statements from Benjamin Bayly (in 1708), Arthur Ashley Sykes (1740), Beilby Porteus (1800), Elihu Palmer (1804), and William Craig Brownlee (1824), all of whom used it in the context of the extraordinary claims of Christian theology and the putative extraordinary evidence supplied by the Bible. Quote Investigator also cites Pierre-Simon Laplace in essays (1810 and 1814) on the stability of the Solar System, and Joseph Rinn (1906), a skeptic of the paranormal. Thomas Jefferson in an 1808 letter expresses contemporary skepticism of meteorites thus: "A thousand phenomena present themselves daily which we cannot explain, but where facts are suggested, bearing no analogy with the laws of nature as yet known to us, their verity needs proofs proportioned to their difficulty."

See also
Burden of proof (philosophy)
Epistemology
Hitchens's razor
Logical positivism
Razor (philosophy)
Theory of justification

References

Aphorisms
Carl Sagan
Skepticism